This is a list of verified common nicknames that notable professional tennis players were personally addressed by. Some are group names collectively referring to more than one player.

A
Ace Queen = Karolína Plíšková
The Arm, The Aussie Amazon, Mighty Maggie = Margaret Court
A-Rod, Rocket Man = Andy Roddick

B
Boom Boom Boris, The Lion of Leimen, Baron von Slam = Boris Becker
The Barcelona Bumblebee = Arantxa Sánchez Vicario
"Le basque bondissant" (French for "The Leaping Basque") = Jean Borotra
Bee = Barbora Strycova 
Big, Bad Betty = Betty Stove
The Big Cat = Miloslav Mecir
Big Bill = William Tilden, Jr. 
Big Foe = Frances Tiafoe 
Big Pancho =  Pancho Gonzales 
Broadway Vitas = Vitas Gerulaitis
The Bulldozer = David Ferrer
Butch	 = 	 Earl Buchholz

C
California Comet  = Maurice McLoughlin
Can't-miss-Swiss = Martina Hingis 
El Chino (Spanish for "The Chinese") = Marcelo Ríos
Chucky = Martina Hingis
Clown Prince of Tennis = Frank Kovacs
The Crocodile 	 = 	 René Lacoste

D
Danimal = Danielle Collins
DelPo = Juan Martin Del Potro
The Demon = Alex De Minaur
(The) Djoker, Nole, Serbinator = Novak Djokovic 
Dominator, The Prince of Clay = Dominic Thiem 
Dreddy = Dustin Brown
La divine (French for "The Goddess"), The Maid Marvel = Suzanne Lenglen

E
Emmo = Roy Emerson
El Peque = Diego Schwartzman
El Pelon= Rafael Osuna
Evonne Sing-A-Long, Sunshine Super Girl = Evonne Goolagong Cawley

F
Fat Dave, El Rey David = David Nalbandian
FedEx(press), King Roger, The (Swiss) Maestro, God of tennis = Roger Federer
Fiery or Fiery Fred = Fred Stolle
The Flying Dutchman = Tom Okker
The Four Musketeers	 = 	
Jean Borotra 
Jacques Brugnon 
Henri Cochet 
René Lacoste 
Fräulein Forehand = Steffi Graf

G
Gentleman Jack = Jack Crawford
Gorgeous Gussie = Gertrude Moran
The Great Dane = Caroline Wozniacki
Guga, Clay Surfer = Gustavo Kuerten
The Generator = Jennifer Capriati
Gonzo = Fernando González

H
Handsome Eight 	 = 	
Pierre Barthes 
Butch Buchholz 
Cliff Drysdale 
John Newcombe 
Nikola Pilić 
Dennis Ralston 
Tony Roche 
Roger Taylor

I
Ivan the Terrible, The Terminator	 = 	Ivan Lendl 
Indian Express	 = 	
Mahesh Bhupathi 
Leander Paes
Ice Borg or Ice Man = 	Björn Borg
Ice Maiden, Ice Princess 	 = 	 Chris Evert

J
 Jimbo = Jimmy Connors
 Juju = Justine Henin

K
The King of Clay, El Matador (Spanish for "The Killer"), Raging Bull = Rafael Nadal

L
The Las Vegas Kid, The Punisher = Andre Agassi
The Leaning Tower of Pasadena = Stan Smith
The Lithuanian Lion 	 = 	 Vitas Gerulaitis
Little Bill = 	William Johnston 
Little Miss Poker Face = Helen Wills Moody
Little Mo =	Maureen Connolly
Little Pancho =      Pancho Segura

M
 Madison Avenue = Madison Keys
Masha, the (Siberian) Siren = Maria Sharapova
 The Magician = Fabrice Santoro
 Marvelous Molla = Molla Bjurstedt Mallory
Mosquito = Juan Carlos Ferrero
Le Mozart Noir (French for "The Black Mozart") = Yannick Noah 
 Muscles 	 = 	 Ken Rosewall
 Musterminator = 	 Thomas Muster
 Muhammad Ali, Smokin' Jo Willy, Tsunami	 = 	Jo-Wilfried Tsonga
 Muzza         =       Andy Murray

N
Naochi = Naomi Osaka
Nasty 	 = 	 Ilie Năstase
Newk = John Newcombe
Navrat the Brat = Martina Navratilova
Ninja = Agnieszka Radwańska

O
Original 9	 = 	
Billie Jean King 
Rosemary Casals 
Nancy Richey 
Peaches Bartkowicz 
Kristy Pigeon 
Valerie Ziegenfuss 
Julie Heldman 
Kerry Reid 
Judy Tegart

P
The Paignton Peach = Sue Barker
Peanut = Mareen Louie-Harper
Peachy	 = 	 Fern Kellmeyer 
Pico = Juan Mónaco
Pistol Pete = Pete Sampras
The Pocket Rocket = Dominika Cibulkova
Prime Time = Grigor Dimitrov 
 Psychedelic Strokeswoman = Françoise Dürr

Q 

 Q = Wang Qiang
Queen V = Venus Williams

R

The Rocket = 	Rod Laver
Rusty 	 = 	Lleyton Hewitt
Rabbit = Wendy Turnbull

S
The Sao Paulo Swallow, the Tennis Ballerina = Maria Bueno
Senorita Topspin = Conchita Martinez
Scud = Mark Philippoussis
Sliderman = Gaël Monfils
Special Kei = Kei Nishikori 
Spice Girls =
Anna Kournikova 
Martina Hingis 
Stanimal, Stan the Man = Stanislas Wawrinka
Superbrat	 = 	John McEnroe
Super Simo = Simona Halep
Swiss Miss = Martina Hingis
SW19, Meka = Serena Williams

T
Tabasco = Fernando Verdasco
Tappy = Art Larsen
The Tennis Baron = Gottfried von Cramm
Tiger Tim, Timbo, Tin Man = Tim Henman
Ted = Cuthbert Tinling
Tomic the Tank Engine = Bernard Tomic
 The Tower of Tandil = Juan Martin Del Potro

W
Wild Thing = Nick Kyrgios
Willie = Guillermo Vilas
The Wizard = Norman Brookes
The Woodies =
Todd Woodbridge
Mark Woodforde

X
X-Man = Xavier Malisse

See also

 Lists of nicknames

References

Nickname
Tennis
Tennis